Public holidays in Honduras are centered on Christianity and the commemoration of events in Honduran history. Each celebration is very important to many families across this country. They are often celebrated with extended family members, and friends. On a few of the most important holidays, such as Independence Day and holy week parades and processions are held from early morning to later in the afternoon or evening.

Public holidays

Non-obligatory

See also

References

 
Honduras